The Sofia Hotel, formerly the Pickwick Terminal Hotel, is a historic hotel in San Diego, in the U.S. state of California. Construction began in 1926.  It opened in May 1927. The hotel was also inducted into Historic Hotels of America, the official program of the National Trust for Historic Preservation, in 2008.

References

External links
 
 

1927 establishments in California
Historic Hotels of America
Hotel buildings completed in 1927
Hotels established in 1927
Hotels in San Diego